Jonathan Mark Naylor (born 1966), commonly known as Jono Naylor, is a New Zealand politician from Palmerston North. He did not stand for re-election as an MP in 2017. In 2018 he was elected to Horizons Regional Council in the by-election following the death of Councillor Pat Kelly. He was re-elected to Horizons in the 2019 local election and was appointed as Horizons deputy chair.

Early life
Naylor was born in Upper Hutt and raised in Wellington, Auckland, and Masterton before moving to Palmerston North to study at Massey University in 1985. In 1997, he earned a Bachelor of Social Work. He is married with three children.

Political career

Naylor became a member of the city council in 2001 and was elected mayor in 2007, defeating incumbent Heather Tanguay.

He promised to resign as mayor if elected to Parliament. Naylor was beaten in the election by the incumbent, Labour's Iain Lees-Galloway. Naylor was in 51st place on National's party list, and based on preliminary results, he was returned as a list MP, but this was not certain as the counting of special votes might have changed the number of List MPs elected for National.

He declined to resign as long as his election as an MP was not guaranteed, with final results of the election being published on 4 October. This caused some protest, as he was meanwhile drawing two salaries. The delay in decision making also meant that a by-election for mayor could not be held before year's end, and would thus be held during February, with campaigning falling into the main holiday period; Lees-Galloway suggested that Naylor should meanwhile donate one of his salaries. When the final results did come out, Naylor's election was confirmed, but he was now the lowest-ranked National MP, with Maureen Pugh in 52nd place having lost her place in Parliament. Naylor announced that his resignation as mayor is to follow shortly. Grant Smith was elected in his place in February 2015.

He announced in late 2016 that he would not seek re-election at the 2017 general election.

References

1966 births
Living people
People from Upper Hutt
Massey University alumni
Mayors of Palmerston North
New Zealand National Party MPs
Members of the New Zealand House of Representatives
New Zealand list MPs
21st-century New Zealand politicians